The 1953 Worcester tornado was an extremely powerful and destructive tornado that struck the city of Worcester, Massachusetts and surrounding areas on Tuesday, June 9, 1953. It was part of the Flint–Worcester tornado outbreak sequence, which occurred over a three-day period from June 6–9, 1953. The storm stayed on the ground for nearly 90 minutes, traveling 48 miles across Central Massachusetts. In total, 94 people were killed, making it the 21st deadliest tornado in the history of the United States, and the deadliest in the history of New England. In addition to the fatalities, nearly 1,300 people were injured and 4,000 buildings were damaged. The tornado caused $52 million in damage (equivalent to $ million in ). After the Fujita scale was developed in 1971, the storm was classified as F4, the second highest rating on the scale.

At approximately 4:25 pm (EST), the tornado touched down in a forest near the town of Petersham, and proceeded to move through Barre, where two people were killed. It then moved through the western suburbs of Worcester, where 11 more people were killed. The storm then passed through Worcester, where it destroyed Assumption College and several other buildings, killing 60. After striking Worcester, it killed 21 more people in the towns of Shrewsbury, Southborough, and Westborough, before dissipating over Framingham. According to National Weather Service estimates, over 10,000 people were left homeless as a result of the tornado.

Meteorological synopsis

Buildup to storm

On June 7, 1953, a strong shortwave trough moved eastward over the Rocky Mountains, bringing with it strong upward motion that induced lee cyclogenesis: the formation of a low-pressure area over eastern Colorado. In combination with the warm unstable air in place over the Great Plains, and an elevated mixed layer from the desert southwest, this led to conditions favorable for severe thunderstorms and tornadoes. More than 30 tornadoes occurred that day across Colorado, Kansas, Nebraska, and Iowa, including a violent tornado that killed 11 people near Arcadia, Nebraska. On June 8 the storm system moved northeast  These conditions led to several tornadoes in the states of Michigan, Ohio, and Nebraska: most notably the Flint-Beecher tornado. The storm killed 116 people in the northern Flint suburb of Beecher, and injured 844. In addition, seven other tornadoes across the region caused 449 more injuries and 26 more fatalities. After the use of the Fujita scale began, the Flint-Beecher tornado was rated F5.

On the morning of June 9, the low pressure system had moved northeastward into Ontario near the south end of Hudson Bay. An occluded front extended south from it, towards a triple point with a warm front and cold front near the northern end of Lake Superior. The warm front extended southeast across New York, Pennsylvania, and New Jersey, and over the course of the day moved northeast, bringing warm, moist, unstable air into the New England area, including Massachusetts. In the mid-atmosphere, the elevated mixed layer was still in place, keeping storms from forming earlier in the day before maximum temperatures were reached.

Forecasters at the National Weather Service office in Boston believed that there was a possibility for tornado activity in the area, but decided not to include it in their forecast for the day in fear that they would cause panic among local citizens. 1953 was the first year that tornado and severe thunderstorm warnings were used, so forecasters compromised and issued the first severe thunderstorm watch in the history of Massachusetts. Most news reports only made mentions of possible thunderstorms. Because of this, the tornado struck with little to no warning for residents.

Tornado event

The tornado descended over the Quabbin Reservoir in Petersham, Massachusetts, at 4:25 P.M., and was witnessed by boaters on the reservoir - three funnels were seen at the beginning, with rapid dissipation of one of them. After brushing Petersham (occasionally with twin funnels several hundred feet apart), the tornado tracked southeastwards and slammed into the rural towns of Barre and Rutland, with two fatalities occurring at each of these locations. The now 
massive tornado then tore directly through suburban Holden, completely wiping out the Brentwood Estates subdivision, resulting in fatalities.

Damage was phenomenal in Worcester (second-largest city in Massachusetts) and in some areas equaled the worst damage in any U.S. tornado. Hardest-hit areas included Assumption College (building is now home to Quinsigamond Community College), where a priest and two nuns were killed. The main building's -thick brick walls were reduced by three floors, and the landmark tower lost three stories. A nearby storage tank, weighing several tons, was lofted and tossed across a road by the tornado. The nearby Burncoat Hill neighborhood saw heavy devastation (especially on its western slope), but it was the Uncatena-Great Brook Valley neighborhoods to the east of Burncoat Hill that were utterly leveled, with the tornado possibly reaching F5 intensity in this area. Houses simply vanished, with the debris granulated and scattered well away from the foundations. Entire rows of homes were swept away in some areas. Forty people died in the Uncatena-Great Brook Valley areas alone. A  bus was picked up, rolled over several times and was thrown against the newly constructed Curtis Apartments in Great Brook Valley, resulting in the deaths of two passengers. Across Boylston St. from the Curtis Apartments, the Brookside Home Farm (a city-operated dairy facility and laundry) sustained total damage, with six men killed and the loss of its herd of 80 Holsteins. Houses and bodies were blown into Lake Quinsigamond. The six fatalities at Brookside were the most in any one building in the tornado's path.

The funnel maintained a  width throughout much of Shrewsbury (12 killed), and was still doing maximum damage when it moved through downtown Westborough (five deaths), where it began curving towards the northeast in its final leg. In the storm's final moments, three people perished in the collapse of the Fayville Post Office in Southborough. Coincidentally, around the time it ended at 5:45 P.M., a tornado warning was issued, although by then it was too late. A separate F3 tornado also struck about the same time the warning was issued, in the nearby communities of Sutton, Northbridge, Mendon, Bellingham, Franklin, Wrentham and Mansfield in Massachusetts, injuring 17 persons. Another tornado did minor damage and caused several injuries in Fremont and Exeter in Rockingham County, New Hampshire; other smaller tornadoes occurred in Colrain, Massachusetts and Rollinsford, New Hampshire.

Baseball-size hail was reported in a score of communities affected by the Worcester supercell. Airborne debris was strewn eastward, reaching the Blue Hill Meteorological Observatory 35 mi (56 km) away, and even out over Massachusetts Bay and the Atlantic Ocean. Some debris was found in the Atlantic Ocean. This is one of the greatest such instances in a U.S. tornado.

Aftermath

The Worcester tornado was a milestone in many regards. Besides its enormous size and unusual geographic location, at the time it was the nation's costliest tornado in raw dollars. Its 1,300 injuries were the 3rd worst in U.S. history (until the 1979 Wichita Falls tornado bumped it to number 4, where it still stands). The tally of 10,000 homeless stood unchallenged for 26 years until the '79 Wichita Falls storm.

However, the Worcester tornado's greatest effect on the nation was its being the principal catalyst for the Storm Prediction Center's reorganization on June 17, 1953, and subsequent implementation of a nationwide radar/storm spotter system. The results proved successful: since June 9, 1953, no single U.S. tornado had killed over 100 people until the Joplin, Missouri tornado of May 22, 2011.

The severity of this epic storm remained in dispute for a long period within the meteorological community. Official observations classified this tornado as F4, but damage was consistent with an F5 tornado in five of the affected towns (Rutland, Holden, Worcester, Shrewsbury and Westborough). As a result of this debate, the National Weather Service took an unprecedented step and convened a panel of weather experts during the spring of 2005 to study the latest evidence on the wind strength of the Worcester tornado. The panel considered whether to raise its designation to F5, but decided during the summer of 2005 to keep the official rating as a strong F4. The reasoning for this was that the anchoring techniques used in many of the destroyed or vanished homes could never now be ascertained with certainty, and some of these structures (many of recent postwar construction) were possibly more vulnerable to high winds than older homes. Without a proper engineering qualification, it would be nearly impossible to determine with 100% accuracy which damage was F5 and which was F4, as appearances would be similar.

Sources

 Wallace Anthony F.C. 1956. Tornado in Worcester; an exploratory study of individual and community behavior in an extreme situation. NAS. https://archive.org/details/tornadoinworcest00wallrich  Wallace's classic study on the impact of the Worcester tornado ]

Notes

References

External links

Video of before the tornado, and damage following it (YouTube)
Slideshow of damage (City of Worcester)
Tornado in Worcester National Academy of Sciences: National Research Council
Video of the tornado in the Southborough area (YouTube)

Worcester
Worcester 1953-06
Worcester Tornado
History of Worcester, Massachusetts
History of Worcester County, Massachusetts
History of Middlesex County, Massachusetts
Tornado, Worcester
Tornado, Worcester
Shrewsbury, Massachusetts
Southborough, Massachusetts
Westborough, Massachusetts
Framingham, Massachusetts
Petersham, Massachusetts
Assumption University (Worcester)